Riverside–Downtown station (officially the Joseph Tavaglione Riverside Downtown Station) is a train station in Riverside, California, United States. It is served by three Metrolink commuter rail lines – the 91/Perris Valley Line, Inland Empire–Orange County Line, and Riverside Line – and Amtrak intercity rail service on the Southwest Chief The station is owned by the Riverside County Transportation Commission.

Station layout 
The station has two island platforms and one side platform. It is located at the east end of the Union Pacific Railroad (UP) Los Angeles Subdivision at its junction with the BNSF San Bernardino Subdivision. The northern island platform and the side platform serve the UP main track and a stub-end siding; they are used only by Riverside Line trains. The three-track BNSF mainline is between the island platforms; the southern island platform (used by Amtrak, 91/Perris Valley Line, and Inland Empire–Orange County Line trains) serves the southern main track and a siding track.

Hours and frequency

History 

The current station opened for Metrolink Riverside Line service on June 14, 1993. Intercity service at the nearby Union Pacific Railroad station lasted until May 1971.

Inland Empire–Orange County Line service began on October 2, 1995; Riverside was the terminus of that line until the following year when the extension to San Bernardino opened. Amtrak's Southwest Chief began stopping at Riverside in April 2002. Metrolink's 91/Perris Valley Line (then the 91 Line), began operating on May 6, 2002. Again, Riverside was the terminus until the Perris Valley Line extension opened in 2016.

In December 2012, the station was renamed after Joseph Tavaglione, a local businessman and chair of the California Transportation Commission.

References

External links 

Riverside station – USA Rail Guide (TrainWeb)

Railway stations in Riverside County, California
Metrolink stations in Riverside County, California
Transportation in Riverside, California
Railway stations in the United States opened in 1993
Amtrak stations in Riverside County, California